Jiang Weiqing (November 26, 1910 – June 16, 2000) was a People's Republic of China politician. He was born in Pingjiang County, Hunan Province. He was Chinese Communist Party Committee Secretary and CPPCC Committee Chairman of Jiangsu Province and Chinese Communist Party Committee Secretary of Jiangxi Province.

External links
   高华：北京政争与地方 释读《江渭清回忆录》

1910 births
2000 deaths
People's Republic of China politicians from Hunan
Chinese Communist Party politicians from Hunan
Political office-holders in Jiangsu
Political office-holders in Jiangxi
Governors of Jiangxi
Politicians from Yueyang